Massimo Corvo (born 9 July 1959) is an Italian actor and voice actor.

Biography
Born in Rome, Corvo has been most active in voice dubbing since the late 1980s. He has been the official Italian voice of Sylvester Stallone since the death of Ferruccio Amendola in 2001 as well as dubbing over the voice of Laurence Fishburne and Jean Reno. He is also a regular voice actor for Bruce Willis, Patrick Bergin, Tom Sizemore, Vin Diesel, Samuel L. Jackson, Jeff Bridges, Forest Whitaker, Sean Bean, Andy Serkis, Benicio del Toro, Michael Clarke Duncan and more.

Corvo is best known for dubbing over the voice of Morpheus (portrayed by Laurence Fishburne) in Matrix trilogy as well as the title character (portrayed by Tony Todd) in the Candyman trilogy, and others. He has also dubbed over a number of animated roles, including the Beast in Beauty and the Beast, Shan-Yu in Mulan, Bloat in Finding Nemo, Pete in Goof Troop, and Jafar in Aladdin. In addition, he dubs over Gendo Ikari in the anime series Neon Genesis Evangelion.

As an actor, Corvo has appeared in at least two films and several television shows, most notably Butta la luna and Il capitano.

Filmography

Cinema
Il gioco (1999)
Do You Mind If I Kiss Mommy? (2003)

Television
Distretto di Polizia (2003)
Il maresciallo Rocca (2005)
Il capitano (2005, 2007)
Butta la luna (2006, 2009)
Il peccato e la vergogna (2010)
Cugino & cugino (2011)
Squadra antimafia – Palermo oggi (2011-2014)
Il bello delle donne... alcuni anni dopo (2017)

Dubbing roles

Animation
Beast in Beauty and the Beast
Beast in Beauty and the Beast: The Enchanted Christmas
Beast in Belle's Magical World
Jafar in Aladdin
Jafar in The Return of Jafar
Jafar in Mickey's House of Villains
Jafar / Mukhtar in Aladdin: The Animated Series
Owl in The Many Adventures of Winnie the Pooh
Owl in Pooh's Grand Adventure: The Search for Christopher Robin
Owl in Seasons of Giving
Owl in The Tigger Movie
Owl in Piglet's Big Movie
Owl in Winnie the Pooh
Owl in Christopher Robin
Owl in The New Adventures of Winnie the Pooh
Owl in The Book of Pooh
Pete in All Disney Productions (1993-2011)
Shan Yu in Mulan
Lucius Best / Frozone in The Incredibles
Lucius Best / Frozone in Incredibles 2
Kago in Tarzan II
Undertow in The Little Mermaid II: Return to the Sea
Bloat in Finding Nemo
Bloat in Finding Dory
Butch in The Good Dinosaur
Bruton in Dinosaur
Alexander W. Wolf in Hoodwinked!
Iron Giant in The Iron Giant
Stan Beals in The Ant Bully
Thrax in Osmosis Jones
Mr. Bergermeister in Frankenweenie
Steele in Balto
Little John in Tom and Jerry: Robin Hood and His Merry Mouse
Narrator in TMNT
Lovelace in Happy Feet
Various characters in Disney's House of Mouse
Various characters in Mickey's Magical Christmas: Snowed in at the House of Mouse
Various characters in Return to Never Land
Principal Skinner in The Simpsons (seasons 5-8)
Groot in Guardians of the Galaxy
Iron Man in Iron Man
Gendo Ikari in Neon Genesis Evangelion
Ruber in Quest for Camelot
Obelix in Asterix Conquers America
Drago Bludvist in How to Train Your Dragon 2
Victor Von Ion in Ratchet & Clank
Xibalba in The Book of Life
Ralph in Timon & Pumbaa
Massimo Marcovaldo in Luca

Live action
Joe Tanto in Driven
Jake Malloy in D-Tox
Rocky Balboa in Rocky Balboa
Rocky Balboa in Creed
Rocky Balboa in Creed II
Frankie Delano in Avenging Angelo
John Rambo in Rambo
John Rambo in Rambo: Last Blood
Sebastian in Spy Kids 3-D: Game Over
Barney Ross in The Expendables
Barney Ross in The Expendables 2
Barney Ross in The Expendables 3
Dean Stevens in Shade
Gabe Walker in Cliffhanger (2010 redub)
Jimmy Bobo in Bullet to the Head
Ray Breslin in Escape Plan
Ray Breslin in Escape Plan 2: Hades
Ray Breslin in Escape Plan: The Extractors
Henry "Razor" Sharp in Grudge Match
Morpheus in The Matrix
Morpheus in The Matrix Reloaded
Morpheus in The Matrix Revolutions
Jimmy Jump in King of New York
Roosevelt Stokes in Cadence
Othello in Othello
Omar in Ride Along
Bill Foster / Goliath in Ant-Man and the Wasp
Charles Piper in Fled
Captain Miller in Event Horizon
Bumpy Johnson in Hoodlum
Whitey Powers in Mystic River
Ahmat in Five Fingers
Norrin Radd / Silver Surfer in Fantastic Four: Rise of the Silver Surfer
Archie Green in Tortured
Roland Noland in Predators
Ellis Cheever in Contagion
Perry White in Man of Steel
Perry White in Batman v Superman: Dawn of Justice
Omar in Ride Along
Gus Mancuso in Passengers
Bowery King in John Wick: Chapter 2
Warren Lewis in The Mule
Raymond Langston in CSI: Crime Scene Investigation
Jack Crawford in Hannibal
Enzo Molinari in The Big Blue
Léon Montana in Léon: The Professional
Molok Edramareck in Witch Way Love
Hubert Fiorentini in Wasabi
Thibault in Just Visiting
Félix in Jet Lag
Ruby in Ruby & Quentin
Pierre Niemans in Crimson Rivers II: Angels of the Apocalypse
Ange Leoni in The Corsican File
Jean-Louis Schiffer in Empire of the Wolves
Gilbert Ponton in The Pink Panther
Gilbert Ponton in The Pink Panther 2
Georges Thenault in Flyboys
Maxime Dubreuil in Cash
Milo Malakian in The First Circle
Charly Matteï in 22 Bullets
Ramon Cameron in Margaret
Alexandre Lagarde in The Chef
Giles Mercier in Alex Cross
Diego Baresco in Hector and the Search for Happiness
Paul Mazuret in My Summer in Provence
Jo Saint-Clair in Jo
Amos in The Color of Money
Jack Pismo in Stakeout
Dekker in Diary of a Hitman
Fred Whitmore in Last Light
Cyrus Cole in Smoke
Ghost Dog in Ghost Dog: The Way of the Samurai
Dante Jackson in Light It Up
Ker in Battlefield Earth
Addie in Green Dragon
Ted Younger in Mary
Carter in American Gun
Abe Holt in A Little Trip to Heaven
Clyde Snow in Even Money
Bradford Boyd in Our Family Wedding
Ronny in Catch .44
Dennis Lureu in Freelancers
John Bannister in The Last Stand
G. T. Weber in Arrival
Dominic Toretto in The Fast and the Furious
Dominic Toretto in The Fast and the Furious: Tokyo Drift
Dominic Toretto in Fast & Furious
Dominic Toretto in Fast Five
Dominic Toretto in Fast & Furious 6
Dominic Toretto in Furious 7
Dominic Toretto in The Fate of the Furious
Dominic Toretto in F9
Shane Wolfe in The Pacifier
Richard B. Riddick in Pitch Black
Richard B. Riddick in The Chronicles of Riddick
Richard B. Riddick in Riddick
Hugo Toorop in Babylon A.D.
Groot in Guardians of the Galaxy
Baby Groot / Stakar of the House of Ogord in Guardians of the Galaxy Vol. 2
Groot in Avengers: Infinity War
Groot in Avengers: Endgame
Kaulder in The Last Witch Hunter
Boromir in The Lord of the Rings: The Fellowship of the Ring
Boromir in The Lord of the Rings: The Two Towers
Ian Howe in National Treasure
Marcus Rich in Flightplan
Zeus in Percy Jackson & the Olympians: The Lightning Thief
The King in Mirror Mirror
Stinger Apini in Jupiter Ascending
Corporal Hill in Pixels
Mitch Henderson in The Martian
Amal in The Lost Future
Eddard Stark in Game of Thrones
Paul Winstone in Missing
Martin Odum in Legends
Jimmy Dove / Liam McGivney in Blown Away
Obadiah Stane / Iron Monger in Iron Man
Dr. Mark Powell in K-PAX
Tom Friend in Masked and Anonymous
Michael Faraday in Arlington Road
Jimmy Berg in Scenes of the Crime
John Gregory in Seventh Son
Daniel Flynn / Dock O'Kelly in Bad Times at the El Royale
Calvin Hart in Kiss of Death
Trevor Garfield in One Eight Seven
Louis Batiste in Eve's Bayou
Romulus Ledbetter in The Caveman's Valentine
Neville Flynn in Snakes on a Plane
Stephen in Django Unchained
Chaney in Oldboy
Clinton Davis in Reasonable Doubt
Pat Novak in RoboCop
George Washington Williams in The Legend of Tarzan
Preston Packard in Kong: Skull Island
Gaspare Spoglia in The Funeral
Jack Jordan in 21 Grams
Jack "Jackie Boy" Rafferty in Sin City
Miguel "Lado" Arroyo in Savages
Jimmy Picard in Jimmy P: Psychotherapy of a Plains Indian
Sauncho Smilax in Inherent Vice
Alejandro Gillick in Sicario
Alejandro Gillick in Sicario: Day of the Soldado
Daniel Robitaille / Candyman in Candyman
Daniel Robitaille / Candyman in Candyman: Farewell to the Flesh
Daniel Robitaille / Candyman in Candyman: Day of the Dead
Emmett Smith in In Country
Korben Dallas in The Fifth Element
William McNamara in Hart's War
A.K Waters in Tears of the Sun
Jeff Talley in Hostage
Harry Rydell in Fast Food Nation
Supreme Leader Snoke in Star Wars: Episode VII – The Force Awakens
Supreme Leader Snoke in Star Wars: Episode VIII – The Last Jedi
Supreme Leader Snoke in Star Wars: Episode IX – The Rise of Skywalker
Caesar in Dawn of the Planet of the Apes
Caesar in War for the Planet of the Apes
The Duke in The Adventures of Huck Finn
Valentin Zukovsky in The World Is Not Enough
Peter Godley in From Hell
Mr. Jaggers in Great Expectations
Cassiel in City of Angels
Don in Live!
Perry Jackson in Passengers
Sheriff Henry Millard in The Baytown Outlaws
Gary Simmons in Betrayed
Jake Taylor in Major League II
Jonathan Shale in The Substitute
Clifford Dubose in A Murder of Crows
David Levinson in Independence Day
David Levinson in Independence Day: Resurgence
Sean Fletcher in Nine Months
Colonel Attar in Planet of the Apes
Jamal Starkweather in The Island
Erlik in Cross
Leo Knox in The Finder
Ernest P. Worrell in Ernest Goes to Camp
Ernest P. Worrell in Ernest Saves Christmas
Ernest P. Worrell in Ernest Scared Stupid
Del Griffith in Planes, Trains and Automobiles
C.D. Marsh in Career Opportunities
Jack Vincennes in L.A. Confidential
Mickey in Hurlyburly
Ron Witwicky in Transformers: Revenge of the Fallen
Ron Witwicky in Transformers: Dark of the Moon
Nathan Jones in Con Air
R.H. Weyland in Death Race 3: Inferno
Gordon Fleming in Session 9
Corban Yaxley in Harry Potter and the Deathly Hallows – Part 1
Joseph in Tyrannosaur
Narrator in Ted
Narrator in Ted 2
J. Bruce Ismay in Titanic
Mr. White in Reservoir Dogs
David Fisk in Righteous Kill
Michael Jordan in Space Jam
Mac MacGuff in Juno
Bruce Wayne / Batman in Batman & Robin
N'Goo Tuana in Scooby-Doo
Don Owen in Golden Boy
Nathaniel Barnes in Gotham
Jim Walsh in Beverly Hills, 90210
Wallace Boden in Chicago Fire
Bobby Munson in Sons of Anarchy
Cassius in Little Nicky
Octavius in Night at the Museum: Battle of the Smithsonian
Odin in Son of the Mask

Video games
Jafar in Disney's Aladdin in Nasira's Revenge
Supreme Leader Snoke in Lego Star Wars: The Force Awakens
Doomfist in Overwatch
Lucius Best / Frozone in The Incredibles
Lucius Best / Frozone in The Incredibles: Rise of the Underminer

References

External links
 
 
 

1959 births
Living people
Male actors from Rome
Italian male voice actors
Italian male film actors
Italian male television actors
Italian male video game actors
Italian voice directors
20th-century Italian male actors
21st-century Italian male actors